Ejigu is a personal name of Ethiopian origin which may refer to:

Sentayehu Ejigu (born 1985), Ethiopian long-distance runner and world medallist
Deriba Merga Ejigu (born 1980), Ethiopian long-distance runner and 2009 winner of the Boston Marathon

Amharic-language names